Letenice is a small village north of Kranj in the Upper Carniola region of Slovenia. It includes the hamlets of Zavoda and Kamnjek.

References

External links
Letenice on Geopedia

Populated places in the City Municipality of Kranj